Wars is a Canadian drama film, directed by Nicolas Roy and released in 2021. The film stars Éléonore Loiselle as Emma Ducharme, a young military cadet who is sexually assaulted by her commanding officer (David La Haye) after they are stationed in Eastern Europe.

The cast also includes Fanny Mallette and Martine Francke.

The film premiered in competition at the 2021 Karlovy Vary Film Festival, where Loiselle won the award for Best Actress.

It was acquired for commercial distribution by Be For Films.

References

External links
 

2021 films
2021 drama films
Canadian war drama films
Quebec films
2020s French-language films
French-language Canadian films
2020s Canadian films